The Licking Heights Local School District is a local Ohio public school district straddling Franklin and Licking counties.

Licking Heights has established a strong partnership with META/Facebook, resulting in state-of-the-art STEM labs within the high and middle school buildings.

Governance
The school district is governed by a five-member school board, elected in two classes by block voting. The current members of this board are:  
Paul Johnson, president
Brian Bagley, vice president
Mark Rader
Tiffany Blumhorst
Tracy Russ
Licking Heights is under the Ohio Department of Education. It is a member of LACA, which provides services such as an online grade book and a mentor-ship program for high school students.

Schools
 Licking Heights High School
 Licking Heights Middle School
 Licking Heights Central Intermediate
 Licking Heights North (elementary school)
 Licking Heights West and Licking Heights South (elementary schools)

References

2000 establishments in Ohio
Education in Licking County, Ohio
School districts established in 2000
School districts in Ohio